Chow-chow (also spelled chowchow or chow chow) is a North American pickled relish.

History
Possibly chow-chow found its way to the Southern United States during the expulsion of the Acadian people from Nova Scotia and their settlement in Louisiana. It is eaten by itself or as a condiment on fish cakes, mashed potatoes, biscuits and gravy, pinto beans, hot dogs, hamburgers and other foods.  Southern food historian John Egerton cited a connection to relish recipes of Chinese rail workers in the 19th century.

Preparation

An early 20th-century American recipe for chow chow was made with cucumbers, onions, cauliflower and green peppers left overnight in brine, boiled in (cider) vinegar with whole mustard seed and celery seeds, then mashed into a paste with mustard, flour and turmeric.

Regional variations
Its ingredients vary considerably, depending on whether it is the "Northern" (primarily Pennsylvanian) or "Southern" variety, as well as separate (and likely the original) Canadian variety, prevalent in the Maritimes.  The former is made from a combination of vegetables, mainly green and red tomatoes, onions, carrots, beans of various types, asparagus, cauliflower and peas.  The latter is entirely or almost entirely green tomatoes or cabbage. These ingredients are pickled in a canning jar. After preserving, chow-chow is served cold, often as a condiment or relish.

Chow-chow has become regionally associated with the Southern United States, Pennsylvania, New Mexico, the Appalachian Mountains, and the Maritime provinces of Canada. The recipes vary greatly; some varieties are sweeter than others. Pennsylvania chow-chow, known by the Wos-Wit brand, is generally much sweeter than the Southern varieties.

Terminology
The origin of the term "chow-chow" is obscure. The term "chow-chow" is sometimes used interchangeably with the term "piccalilli" (an English version of Indian-style pickles).

It has also been suggested that the name "chow-chow" is rooted in the French word chou for cabbage, or that it comes from choufleur which is French for cauliflower, with chou-chou also being a term of endearment.

See also

References

External links
 What is Chow-Chow?

Cuisine of the Southern United States
New Mexican cuisine
Pickles